The 2002–03 Logan Cup was a first-class cricket competition held in Zimbabwe from 11 October 2002 – 28 April 2003. It was won by Mashonaland, who won four of their six matches to top the table with 92 points.

Points table

References

2002 in Zimbabwean cricket
2003 in Zimbabwean cricket
Domestic cricket competitions in 2002–03
Logan Cup